The R585 road is a regional road in Ireland which links the village of Kealkill with the N22 road in County Cork.

The road passes through Crookstown.

See also 

 Roads in Ireland
 National primary road
 National secondary road

References 

Regional roads in the Republic of Ireland
Roads in County Cork